The Audi RS5 Turbo DTM is a Class One Touring Car constructed by the German car manufacturer Audi AG for use in the Deutsche Tourenwagen Masters. The car was an updated version of the previous Audi RS5 DTM that had a naturally aspirated engine. The Audi RS5 Turbo DTM would remain to be based on the production Audi RS5 car. The car made its DTM debut in the 2019 season under "Class 1" regulations and was used until the 2020 season. The RS5 Turbo is Audi's first-turbo powered DTM car.

With a total of 12 wins, 12 pole positions, 18 podium finishes and a total record of 1,132 manufacturer's championship points in 2019, the RS5 Turbo DTM is statistically the fourth most dominant DTM car in the history of the sport with a win percentage of 66.67% against the sport's most dominant car, the 2003 Mercedes CLK DTM with a record of 90%. The car brought Audi its first year of domination in its history in the sport.

At the end of the 2020 season, Audi Sport left DTM after 31 years of participation (with an exception of 1993–1996) as they will be focusing on Formula E. This was the last Audi vehicle in DTM before they left the sport.

Design

Chassis
Audi carried over the RS5 DTM car to undergo a major development for the Class 1 project which will be used for the 2019 season and beyond and rebrand it as Audi RS5 Turbo DTM. The aerodynamic packages of the RS5 Turbo DTM also has significant change including front splitter length cut to 90 millimetres, radiator grill revamp, rear wing width increased to 520 millimetres and also DRS improvement to make cars aggressive for overtaking compared to the Audi RS5 DTM naturally-aspirated. The car made its first shakedown at Circuito do Estoril on 8 November 2018.

The design also features the newly-firewall interior cockpit protection to deflect debris away from a driver's head in the event of an accident.

Engine

The RS5 Turbo DTM features a brand-new RC8 2.0 TFSI engine package built specifically for the car that based on Japanese Super GT GT500 Class 1 regulations dubbed Nippon Race Engine (NRE). The aging Audi  V8 naturally-aspirated engine—which had been used since the inaugural season of the Deutsche Tourenwagen Masters— was replaced by a  inline-4 turbocharged direct-injected RC8 engine developed by Audi which was full custom-built but the cylinder blocks from RC8 engine borrowed from Volkswagen-Audi EA888 2.0 R4 16v TSI/TFSI. During the car's shakedown and preliminary testing phase at the Circuito do Estoril, drivers noted that the change from natural aspiration to a turbocharger meant that the RS5 Turbo DTM required a different driving style to its predecessor, the Audi RS5 DTM NA, as the turbocharger produced more torque and thus required the driver to exercise greater control over the throttle. The Audi RC8 TFSI I-4 turbo engine will also feature the push-to-pass for overtaking manoeuvre improvement.

DTM results

References

External links
Audi Sport Official Website

RS5 Turbo DTM
Deutsche Tourenwagen Masters cars
Audi in motorsport